Carlos Alfonso (born 17 June 1945) is an Argentine equestrian. He competed in two events at the 1976 Summer Olympics.

References

External links
 

1945 births
Living people
Argentine male equestrians
Olympic equestrians of Argentina
Equestrians at the 1976 Summer Olympics
Place of birth missing (living people)